Deer Creek is a stream in St. Louis County the U.S. state of Missouri. It is a tributary of the River des Peres.

Deer Creek was so named due to the presence of deer in the area.

See also
List of rivers of Missouri

References

Geography of St. Louis
Rivers of St. Louis County, Missouri
Rivers of Missouri